Anthony Stephen Patrick Loska (born 11 February 1950) is an English former footballer who played as a left-back. He scored 10 goals in 304 league games in a 12-year career in the Football League with Shrewsbury Town, Port Vale, Chester, and Halifax Town. He was promoted out of the Fourth Division with Chester in 1974–75.

Career
A naturally left footed player, Loska began his career at Shrewsbury Town. Harry Gregg's "Shrews" finished 17th in the Third Division in 1968–69, and then 15th in 1969–70 and 13th in 1970–71. He made 12 league appearances during his three seasons at Gay Meadow.

Loska joined Port Vale in July 1971. In August, after just one game he broke his collarbone, but recovered to post 30 Third Division and five cup appearances in the 1971–72 season. He scored his first goal in the Football League on 6 November, in a 4–4 draw with fallen giants Aston Villa at Vale Park. He scored three goals in 44 games in the 1972–73 campaign, as manager Gordon Lee led the "Valiants" to a sixth-place finish. He played ten games at the start of the 1973–74 season, but switched to Chester in December 1973 as part of an exchange deal that saw Neil Griffiths move in the opposite direction.

Ken Roberts's "Seals" finished seventh in the Fourth Division at the end of the 1973–74 season. He was then an ever-present in the 1974–75 promotion season, and also played his part in the club's surprise run to the semi-finals of the League Cup. Chester finished in 17th spot in 1975–76. Loska scored five goals in 110 league games at Sealand Road.

He moved on to Halifax Town in October 1976 along with fellow Chester defender Chris Dunleavy. The "Shaymen" finished in the re-election zone in 1976–77, before finishing one place above the re-election zone in 1977–78 and then second-from-bottom in 1978–79. In his three seasons at The Shay, Loska made 102 league appearances.

Loska joined Stafford Rangers in 1979 to play in the newly formed Alliance Premier League and played for Droylsden, before joining Nantwich Town in December 1980, helping the club to become Cheshire County League champions in the 1980–81 season. He left in the summer of 1982 after a stint as caretaker-manager to become player-manager at Alsager Town, and later served Leek Town and Winsford United. He became a coaching assistant for Eastwood Hanley, worked as a youth coach at Stoke City and was employed by Abbey Life Insurance.

Career statistics
Source:

Honours
Chester
Football League Fourth Division fourth-place promotion: 1974–75

Nantwich Town
Cheshire County League: 1980–81

References

People from Chesterton, Staffordshire
English footballers
Association football fullbacks
Shrewsbury Town F.C. players
Port Vale F.C. players
Chester City F.C. players
Halifax Town A.F.C. players
Stafford Rangers F.C. players
Droylsden F.C. players
Nantwich Town F.C. players
Alsager Town F.C. players
Leek Town F.C. players
Winsford United F.C. players
English Football League players
National League (English football) players
North West Counties Football League players
Association football coaches
Stoke City F.C. non-playing staff
1950 births
Living people